Medu Art Ensemble was a collective of cultural activists based in Gaborone, Botswana during the height of the anti-apartheid resistance movement during the late twentieth century. The collective formed originally in 1977 as a group of black South African artists mutually invested in regional liberation struggles and resistance to South Africa’s apartheid policy of racial segregation (1948-1994). Medu’s members, or “cultural workers” as they preferred to be called, eventually organized and relocated to Gaborone, Botswana in 1978. They felt that the term "cultural workers" was far more fitting to their mission rather than referring to themselves as artists because the such a pursuit was regarded as something trivial and therefore inherently elitist and white. With the support of the African National Congress (ANC), in Gaborone Medu officially registered as a cultural organization with the Botswanan government. Medu means “roots” in the Northern Sotho language, and so describes the collective's underground operations (in defiance of the apartheid government's ban on oppositional political parties and organizations). The collective’s cultural work was rhizomatic in nature, stretching across seven semi-autonomous units: Film, Graphics, Music, Photography, Poetry, Publishing and Research, and Theatre.

In Gaborone, Medu organized concerts, conducted art and creative writing workshops, produced films, organized public health campaigns, and mounted exhibitions among other activities. The collective also produced agitational newsletters and political posters, both of which sought to simultaneously bolster regional solidarity, critique the injustices of the apartheid state, and promote black consciousness. The Collective consisted of several units - music, theatre, photography, graphic and visual arts and research and production (which was writing) but they were not strictly separated units. One of Medu's flagship events was the 1982 Culture and Resistance Festival and Symposium, which brought thousands of activists, cultural workers, and ordinary people together (from across Africa, the Americas, and Europe) for a week of concerts, exhibitions, talks, workshops and other forms of radical cultural programing. This massive undertaking brought greater attention to Medu's activism, heightening in particular the apartheid government's scrutiny of collective's work. Medu disbanded in 1985, following the South African Defence Force's murderous Raid on Gaborone, which resulted in the death of twelve people, including Medu members Mike Hamlyn, Thamsanga Mnyele, George Phahle, and Lindi Phahle.

Members 
As a multiracial collective of cultural workers, Medu comprised more than sixty visual artists, performers, and writers who, despite their different backgrounds and ideological positions, were collectively invested in regional liberation and resistance to apartheid rule. Although most members were South African, many hailed from Botswana, Canada, Cuba, Sweden, and the United States of America. Members of the collective included Gwen Ansell, Theresa Devant, Sergio-Albio González, Jonas Gwangwa, Basil Jones, Michael Kahn, Heinz Klugg, Keorapetse Kgositsile, Adrian Kohler, Mandla Langa, Hugh Masekela, Gordon Metz, Thamsanqa Mnyele, Judy Seidman, Mongane Wally Serote, Pethu Serote, and Tim Williams, among many others. The collective originally consisted of just black South African's as its founding members were very much inspired by the Black Consciousness Movement which held the belief, among others, that white sympathisers were ‘more of a hindrance than a help to their cause’. Evidently this position of belief changed and was adapted to fit the ideal of a future South Africa that would be home to all men regardless of race and white people were allowed to join and as such it helped gain international funding for the Ensemble.

Posters 
Medu played a formative role in shaping the visual culture of resistance in South Africa during the late 1970s and early 1980s along with other key printmaking initiatives such as Junction Avenue, Screen Training Project, and Cape Town Arts Project. Operating both contemporaneously with and after Medu, these collectives also issued posters to inform and galvanize their compatriots, countering the disinformation campaigns and ideologies promulgated by the apartheid government. 

The first of Medu's six units to emerge was Publications and Research, which served as the collective’s mouthpiece and administrative organ by generating the collective's meeting minutes, quarterly newsletters, and other publications. This unit operated symbiotically with the Graphics Unit, which designed covers for the newsletters and produced the posters for which Medu is best known. Medu produced over 100 posters during its lifetime, using a range of printing techniques including offset lithograph and screen printing. 

The iconography found across the collective's posters partakes of an international socialist and revolutionary lexicon of broken chains, clenched fists, upraised arms, and heroic depictions of activists and freedom fighters. This symbolism originated in World War I–era labor and anti-oppression movements across the world and was expressed in the work of Soviet and antifascist poster makers, Mexican muralists and print workshop members, and participants in the Harlem Renaissance—all of whom Medu graphic artists acknowledged as sources of inspiration. The posters were often folded inside of newsletters and clandestinely smuggled into South Africa where they were often posted in public spaces before being torn down by state police or censors. Numerous examples of Medu's posters appeared on official censorship registries in accordance with apartheid state's 1974 Publications Act which outlined materials the regime deemed "undesirable," or potentially threatening to apartheid law; during the 1980s, newspapers such as the Rand Daily Mail ran columns on censored material, many of which included Medu's posters and newsletters. These posters were either smuggled into South Africa by sympathetic travellers or diplomats and then placed on walls where they may have only lasted a few hours until they were torn down by the police. Other posters, the majority of one that still exists today, were sent across to the world so as to raise awareness about the issues in South Africa.

Medu's posters range in their content. Posters intended for South African audiences forcefully scrutinized the pernicious mechanism and brutality of apartheid through bold imagery and slogans, while others promoted the various cultural activities Medu's Film, Photography, Theatre, and Music units organized in Gaborone. The posters were typically produced through dialogue among Medu's participants, with individual or groups of members contributing to different designs before presenting proposals to the entire collective for approval. While posters for temporal-specific events such as concerts were often produced in short runs, others with evergreen political content were issued in the hundreds, especially in the lead up to the collective's 1982 Culture and Resistance Festival and Symposium where posters were given out to attendees.

Today the Medu posters serve as a rich source, they provide information that has little to no documentation elsewhere as South Africa's harsh censorship laws forbid such intelligence to be shared in the country. Gaborone in Botswana was an ideal location for the Collective not just geographically (very close to the border to South Africa and neighboring to a number of Africa countries) but also this distance served as a chance for artists to work outside of the numerous censorship laws, a chance to express themselves and to be free of the restrictive Apartheid laws. The Medu Ensemble were not the first ones to discover the advantages of the capital, the Afrikaans couple Marius and Jeanette Schoon had set the works in place in 1977 when they founded bases there for the anti-apartheid movement. 

The Medu Art Ensemble's ties with the African National Congress (ANC) and the Umkhonto We Sizwe (MK) its paramilitaryary wing are a contentious issue. Due to the Ensemble's underground nature clear evidence is limited. The ANC was banned by the South African government in 1960 but their operations continued in secret. Officially the Medu were not tied with the ANC and the Ensemble claimed to be impartial but Medu member poet Dr Wally Serote describes the Medu members as "cadres of the ANC." The Ensemble's involvement may have fuelled their motives but it may have also contributed to their downfall and abrupt end as the SADF forces claim that their Botswana Raid 1985 was motivated by their intelligence that alleged that they were to attack ANC members.

At 1.40am on 14 June 1985 the South African Defense Forces (SADF) crossed the border into Botswana and began a raid that lasted a total of 40 minutes but caused the destruction of buildings as well as the death of twelve (the exact number is unclear) and other injured. The attack did not come completely as a surprise to the Medu members as they were constantly on guard and after the attack, the representative of Botswana for the United Nations called for an urgent meeting of the Council where the event was called an "unprovoked and unwarranted attack. The United Nations Resolution 568 drafted on 21 June 1985 ordered ‘full and adequate compensation by South Africa to Botswana' for the damages and Botswana's status and place of refugee for those affected by the apartheid regime was reiterated.

Exhibitions 
Medu's work has been the subject of several exhibitions. In 2008, the Johannesburg Art Gallery mounted the exhibition Thami Mnyele + Medu Art Ensemble, which centered on the work of Thamsanqa (Thami) Mnyele and his contribution's to Medu's Graphics Unit. This comprehensive exhibition brought together artwork by Mnyele, a substantial collection of Medu's posters, and archival documents, media, and ephemera attesting to the collective's cultural programming and tragic dissolution. 

Medu's posters were included in the 2011 exhibition, Impressions from South Africa,1965 to Now at the Museum of Modern Art, New York. 

In 2019, the Art Institute of Chicago organized The People Shall Govern! Medu Art Ensemble and the Anti-Apartheid Poster, the first exhibition on Medu's work in North America.

Bibliography 
Key sources of scholarship on Medu Art Ensemble include:

 Antawan I. Byrd and Felicia Mings, eds., The People Shall Govern! Medu Art Ensemble and the Anti-Apartheid Poster (Art Institute of Chicago & Yale University Press, 2020)
Shannen L. Hill, Biko's Ghost: the Iconography of Black Consciousness (Minneapolis: University of Minnesota Press, 2015)
Molemo Moiloa, ed., 58 Years of the Treason Trial: Inter-Generational Dialogue as a Method of Learning (Johannesburg: Keleketla Media Arts Project NPC, 2012)
John Peffer, Art and the End of Apartheid. Minneapolis (Minnesota: University of Minnesota Press, 2009)
Diana Wylie, Art + Revolution: The Life and Death of Thami Mnyele, South African Artist (Auckland Park: Jacana, 2008)
Clive Kellner and Sergio-Albio González, eds., Thami Mnyele + Medu Art Ensemble Retrospective: Johannesburg Art Gallery (Johannesburg: Jacana Media, 2008)
Judy Seidman, Red on Black: The Story of the South African Poster Movement (Johannesburg: STE Publishers, 2007)
Giorgio Miescher, Dag Henrichsen, eds., African Posters: A Catalogue of the Poster Collection in the Basler Afrika Bibliographien (Basel: Basler Afrika-Bibliographien, 2004)
Images of Defiance: South African Resistance Posters of the 1980s (Johannesburg: STE Publishers, 2004)

Collections 
Posters (and in some case, newsletters) by Medu Art Ensemble can be found in numerous public collections including:

 South African History Archive
 Freedom Park Archives
 University of the Western Cape, Robben Island Museum
 The Art Institute of Chicago
 Museum of Modern Art, New York
 Basler Afrika Bibliographien, Basel, Switzerland

References 

Resistance movements
1977 establishments in Africa
Anti-Apartheid organisations
Organisations based in Gaborone
Arts organisations based in Botswana